Gianni Antoniazzi (born 5 September 1998) is a Swiss footballer who plays for FC Weesen in the Swiss 1. Liga.

Club career
Antoniazzi was a product of the FC Zürich youth system.  He was transferred on loan to FC Vaduz from January 2019 until June 2019. In July 2019, FC Vaduz made the transfer permanent.  He was part of the team that were runners up in the 2019-20 Swiss Challenge League season. Antoniazzi has won two Liechtenstein Football Cup's with FC Vaduz during the 2018-19 and 2021-22 seasons. He was part of the squad that competed in the UEFA Europa League Qualifying rounds in 2019. Antoniazzi was loaned to FC Chiasso from February 2021 until June 2021.  He returned to FC Vaduz following the loan spell.

On 26 August 2022, Antoniazzi signed with FC Weesen in the fourth-tier Swiss 1. Liga.

International career
Antoniazzi has represented Switzerland at an international level.  He was part of the Switzerland U19s team during qualifying for the 2017 UEFA European Under-19 Championship. On the bench for the first two matches, Antoniazzi made his debut for the team in the final qualification match against Italy U19s.  In July 2017, Antoniazzi played in the 4-0 victory against Liechtenstein U19s.

Career statistics

Club

International career

Honours
FC Vaduz
 Swiss Challenge League runner up: 2019-20
 Liechtenstein Football Cup: 2018-19, 2021-22

References

1998 births
People from Glarus
Living people
Swiss men's footballers
Switzerland youth international footballers
Association football defenders
FC Zürich_players
FC Vaduz players
FC Chiasso players
Swiss Promotion League players
Swiss Challenge League players
Swiss Super League players
Swiss 1. Liga (football) players
Swiss expatriate footballers
Swiss expatriate sportspeople in Liechtenstein
Expatriate footballers in Liechtenstein